T. baileyi may refer to:

Tetraodon baileyi, the former name for Pao baileyi, a species of pufferfish
Thermophis baileyi or Bailey's snake
Tillandsia baileyi, a species of bromeliad

See also
Baileyi (disambiguation)